This is a list of all genera, species and subspecies of the family Anomalepididae, otherwise referred to as primitive blind snakes, or anomalepidids. It follows the taxonomy currently provided by ITIS, which is based on the continuing work of Dr. Roy McDiarmid.

 Anomalepis
 Anomalepis aspinosus
 Anomalepis colombia
 Anomalepis flavapices
 Anomalepis mexicana
 Helminthophis
 Helminthophis flavoterminatus
 Helminthophis frontalis
 Helminthophis praeocularis
 Liotyphlops
 Liotyphlops albirostris
 Liotyphlops anops
 Liotyphlops argaleus
 Liotyphlops beui
 Liotyphlops schubarti
 Liotyphlops ternetzii
 Liotyphlops wilderi
 Typhlophis
 Typhlophis squamosus

References

 
Anomalepididae
Anomalepididae